1854 in philosophy

Events 
 Søren Kierkegaard launches his attack on Christendom represented by the Church of Denmark with a series of newspaper pamphlets and polemics today collected under the title The Moment.

Publications 
 George Boole, The Laws of Thought (1854)
 Henry David Thoreau, Walden (1854)

Births 
 January 1 - James George Frazer (died 1941)
 April 29 - Henri Poincaré (died 1912)

Deaths 
 August 20 - Friedrich Wilhelm Joseph Schelling (born 1775)

References 

Philosophy
19th-century philosophy
Philosophy by year